Ghost Stories is the sixth studio album by British rock band Coldplay. Co-produced by the band with Paul Epworth along with returning Mylo Xyloto producers Dan Green and Rik Simpson, it was released by Parlophone on 16 May 2014. The album was released by Atlantic Records in North America on 19 May 2014. It is the first album by the band in North America under Atlantic, after Coldplay were transferred from Capitol Records in 2013, following the purchase of EMI and its assets by the Universal Music Group in 2012, which required the sale of Parlophone to Warner Music Group.

The album was recorded by the band throughout 2013 and 2014 at the band's purpose-built home studios in London, England, and in Los Angeles. It features guest producers Avicii, Timbaland and Madeon, and the band's frequent collaborator Jon Hopkins. It was promoted by the band  with an accompanying prime time TV special, a visual album, and a special six-date promotional tour of the album, as well as various appearances on television and radio. The album was promoted by four singles: "Magic", the lead single, released in March; "A Sky Full of Stars", released in May; "True Love", released in August; and "Ink", released in October. "Midnight" was released in April as a promotional single for Record Store Day as well. The album was nominated for Best Pop Vocal Album at the 57th Grammy Awards and named Top Rock Album at the 2015 Billboard Music Awards.

The album received mixed to positive reviews, with many critics praising the band's return to the more somber and melancholy style of their earlier music, though some found the album repetitive and lacking direction. It is reported by several media outlets that Chris Martin has said that the album was inspired by his and Gwyneth Paltrow's split in 2014.

Background
In 2011, Coldplay released their fifth studio album, Mylo Xyloto. Originally conceived by the band as a "stripped-down, more acoustic collection", it became one of Coldplay's most experimental and pop-oriented records to date, being described as "luxuriously colourful" where "the choruses are bigger, the textures grander [and] the optimism more optimistic." Produced by Markus Dravs, Brian Eno, Rik Simpson and Dan Green, the album peaked at number one on 18 national album charts and was certified Platinum in 16 countries. Mylo Xyloto had also sold 8 million copies within the first year of release. Coldplay's 2011 single, "Paradise", became the band's second UK number-one single after 2008's "Viva la Vida". Coldplay's subsequent world tour in promotion of Mylo Xyloto visited North America, Europe, Australia and Africa, raising $99.7 million in revenue.

Going into the creative process for their sixth studio album, the band wanted to return to the "stripped-down, more acoustic collection" they had stated their fifth album would be, returning to the original idea of an acoustic-orientated album, with less of the production and sound that made Mylo Xyloto. At the 2013 Brit Awards, drummer Will Champion spoke to Jo Whiley of BBC Radio 2 fame, saying in response to a question about Coldplay's sixth album being more stripped-back: "Yeah, that might be nice, actually. There's only so far you can go without becoming pompous and a bit overblown, so we'll tread that line very carefully. Reset. Recalibrate."

Composition
Ghost Stories has been described as featuring electronica and synth-pop throughout. It is a spiritually driven album that revolves around two major themes mentioned by lead singer Chris Martin. The album explores the idea of past actions, and the effects they can have on your future and one's capacity for unconditional love. To him, Ghost Stories represents "a journey learning about unconditional love" (as said in the televised Making Ghost Stories with Fearne Cotton).

Recording
The creative process and recording sessions for the band's sixth studio album took place between 2013 and early 2014, at their purpose-built studios The Bakery and The Beehive in North London, England, then in Los Angeles for the final process. The creation of the album actually started at Guy Berryman's house in London in early 2013 where he had settled a little studio where everyone gathered to jam and try some new music during a break after the band's big tour for Mylo Xyloto. The band took a different approach for their sixth studio album in contrast to their previous studio albums. Lead singer Chris Martin invited the band to contribute original songwriting material for the album, as opposed to building songs off Martin's ideas as they had done during previous recording sessions. For example, "Magic" was built off a bass riff originally conceived by bassist Guy Berryman in the studio.

According to producer Paul Epworth, the band recorded the album mostly on their own, while his direction helped in "trying to avoid going for any of their obvious clichés". He also added his main influence was that Ghost Stories needed to be recorded solely with electronic drums.

Packaging

The album artwork for Ghost Stories was etched by British-based Czech etching artist Mila Fürstová. The medieval art-driven artwork, measuring 100 by 100 cm, features a pair of angel wings imposed onto a painting of an ocean under a sky at night. The angel wings resemble a broken heart, representing the album's somber theme of melancholic breakups. The wings themselves also feature cryptic imagery of medieval-style drawings of fairly contemporary objects and concepts. The images include a couple in love, a man facing a mirror, a flight of white doves, a circular maze, a girl by candlelight, a window looking out onto an incoming tornado and a garden plant with a ladder, amongst other imagery depicted in the artwork. A larger, digital version of the artwork is available on Coldplay's official website, with the ability to zoom into the artwork with a screen magnifier.

Fürstová had etched the artworks for all of the releases in the Ghost Stories album cycle, including the artwork for singles "Magic" and "Midnight", which all use the same motif of a scenario taking place in a larger body. Fürstová, whose work has been described as "dazzling images [that] are both contemporary and personal, searching in the surreality of dreams, tales and fables that can map the framework of our consciousness", and has won numerous awards, including the Royal College of Art Society Award in 2001 and becoming the youngest academician at the Royal West of England Academy in 2009, was invited by Coldplay to etch artwork for their new album in January 2013. She described the collaboration between her and the band as "a most inspiring journey and a truly humbling experience to cooperate with such talented people".

There are plans for an exhibition of Fürstová's Ghost Stories artworks in the Autumn of 2014 in central London. 25 original etchings and 100 high-quality digital prints of the artwork, all hand-signed by Fürstová, are also set to go on sale on 19 May 2014, the same day Ghost Stories releases in the United Kingdom and the United States.

Promotion

Coldplay performed on the opening night of the televised 2014 iTunes Festival at SXSW on 11 March 2014 at the Moody Theater in Austin, Texas. In addition to performing "Magic" and "Midnight", the band performed "Always in My Head" and "Another's Arms"; the first live performances of the four songs. The band also performed "Magic" in a pre-recorded segment of Sport Relief 2014, which aired on BBC One on 21 March 2014.

In April 2014, Coldplay announced an international scavenger hunt for sheets containing lyrics to the nine songs on the album. The notes, handwritten by Martin, were placed in ghost story books in libraries around the world, with the band tweeting clues leading to their locations. One of the hidden envelopes also contained a special Golden Ticket, allowing its finder and their guest to go to London for the Coldplay concert at the Royal Albert Hall in July.
The lyric sheets were found in libraries in Mexico City, Singapore, Helsinki, Barcelona, Dartford, New York City, Tauranga, Dublin and Johannesburg.

A TV special titled Coldplay: Ghost Stories was filmed 21–23 March 2014 by the Grammy-nominated director Paul Dugdale (Adele, The Rolling Stones) on a custom-built stage in a Sony Pictures movie soundstage in Los Angeles. Coldplay performed material from the album in its entirety for the first time. The show, which included cinematic vignettes and 360-degree projections, was attended by an audience of 800 fans and press, and was broadcast in prime time in several countries in May and June 2014. The special was then sold on DVD and Blu-ray in November 2014. Additional footage was shot at Paradise Cove in Malibu, California, and at Woollett Aquatics Center in Irvine, California, for the film. 
Chris Martin said, "The Ghost Stories show at Sony Studios was a very special moment for our band ... This film is basically our original vision for the Ghost Stories album."
Coldplay was also the musical act for 3 May airing of NBC late-night sketch comedy show Saturday Night Live and performed "Magic" and "A Sky Full of Stars". It was the band's fifth appearance on the show.

On 12 May 2014, seven days before its release date, the album became available to stream in full via iTunes, accompanied by an animated video revolving around Fürstová's album artwork, but the band refused to allow Spotify, Beats Music, Deezer, and Rdio to stream the album until 22 September 2014, which they had previously done on their last album, Mylo Xyloto.

Singles
A music video for "Midnight", the fifth track on the album, was released as a teaser for the band's sixth studio album on 25 February 2014. Ghost Stories was officially unveiled by Coldplay and Parlophone a week later on 3 March 2014, along with its artwork and track listing. "Magic" was released on the same day, being the album's lead single. It was made available to download through iTunes and Amazon.com by pre-ordering the album, with the track working as an "instant-grat" download. Following the release of the song, it charted on 25 national record charts, peaking within the top ten on 18 of them. "Midnight" was then released as a promotional single by Parlophone on 17 April 2014 with a one-sided 7-inch vinyl for Record Store Day, which was limited to 3000 copies.

"A Sky Full of Stars" was released digitally as the second official single on 2 May 2014. Within 24 hours from its iTunes release, the track had sold 121,690 units worldwide, peaking at number one in 86 countries on the iTunes Store Charts. The song reached number ten on the Billboard Hot 100, making it their third top 10 hit and first since "Viva la Vida" in 2008. It also became their first number-one single on the Billboard Hot Rock Songs chart. On 4 August 2014, the band announced that "True Love" would be the third effort from the album. A music video directed by Jonas Åkerlund was released on 22 August 2014, Chris Martin and Jessica Lucas stars as lovers in it.

On 13 October 2014, "Ink" was served as the fourth and final single to Italian contemporary hit radio. On 18 November, the track was sent to modern rock stations in the United States. The music video was written, directed and animated by Blind, which worked with a company by the name "Interlude" to create over 300 possible journeys. 

A video for "All Your Friends" was released on 7 November 2014 for the commemoration of the first World War. Although the track is not available on the standard edition of Ghost Stories, it is available on the A Sky Full of Stars EP worldwide – except for the United States where it is included on the deluxe version of Ghost Stories sold by Target. An official music video for "Ghost Story" was released as a part of the Ghost Stories Live 2014 DVD on 24 November 2014; it was uploaded on the band's official YouTube channel on 9 March 2015. The video was shot in black and white, and shows the band performing the song during their Ghost Stories Tour. Similar to "All Your Friends", the song is available on the A Sky Full of Stars EP and on the Target deluxe edition of the album is the U.S.

Critical reception

Ghost Stories received mixed to positive reviews. At Metacritic, which assigns a normalized rating out of 100 to reviews from mainstream critics, the album received an average score of 61, based on 31 reviews, which indicates "generally favorable reviews". Jason Lipshutz of Billboard wrote the magazine's track-by-track review of the album, praising it as the band's "most listenable album in years" and describing it as "an evocative concoction of sullen phrases, sparse arrangements and powerful themes." Kyle Anderson of Entertainment Weekly commented that Ghost Stories "will likely be remembered as a transitional album" and noted that "while being solid, it feels like a prequel to something better". Larry Fitzmaurice of Pitchfork wrote that the album is a "subdued work that finds Chris Martin and his band crisply moping through mid-tempo soundscapes and fuzzy electronic touches that have the visceral impact of a down comforter tumbling down a flight of stairs." Nick Hasted of The Independent wrote that Martin "accepts his loss too meekly to approach the anguish of a great break-up album", but concluded that the band's "step away from grand platitudes is still one in the right direction". Stephanie Benson of Spin wrote that "its deep sea of synth-encrusted pop glistens under a halo of angelic ambient touches and Martin’s ever-rosy perspective."

Jerry Shriver of USA Today felt that "within the realm of memorable breakup albums", Ghost Stories lacked "the confessional gut-punch of Dylan's Blood on the Tracks, the acrimony of Richard and Linda Thompson's Shoot Out the Lights and the irresistible sonic appeal of Fleetwood Mac's Rumours", ultimately describing it as "not even a particularly memorable Coldplay album". While noting that Ghost Stories "should be applauded for scaling back the gaudy excesses of their previous albums", Consequence of Sound's Josh Terry opined that its songs "suffer from a lack of direction" and "could use the vitality that launched them to the top in the first place". Mikael Wood of the Los Angeles Times wrote, "The nine songs on Ghost Stories hum gently, cultivating an effective sense of intimacy. As always, there's a lot going on in the music, sculpted by the band along with various collaborators." He added, "Coldplay's new album, 'Ghost Stories,' finds the British band setting aside its trademark grandiosity."

Year-end lists

Accolades

Commercial performance
Ghost Stories went number number-one in over 100 countries on iTunes. In the UK Albums Chart, the album sold 168,048 copies during its opening week, becoming the second biggest debut of the year and Coldplay's sixth consecutive number-one album. With 375,000 copies sold by July, it became the best-selling album of the first half of 2014. In the United States, the album opened with 383,000 copies and earned the band's fourth number-one on Billboard 200. It has sold 853,500 copies on the country as of November 2015. Meanwhile, on the Canadian Albums Chart, Ghost Stories sold 49,000 copies during its first week, becoming the fifth-best-selling album of 2014 by selling 117,000 throughout the year. As of August 2017, it has sold over 160,000 copies on the country. Worldwide, the album sold over 3.7 million copies, being the best-selling project of 2014 by a group.

Track listing 
Coldplay's songwriting members are Guy Berryman, Jonny Buckland, Will Champion and Chris Martin.

Notes
 signifies a co-producer.
"Midnight" contains samples of the track "The Fourth State II" by Jon Hopkins.
"Another's Arms" contains a vocal sample from "Silver Chord" by Jane Weaver.
"O" contains the hidden track "Fly On" (0:00–3:51), which is followed by approximately 2 minutes and 26 seconds of silence; "O" begins at 6:18.
There is no silence between "Fly On" and "O" in the Target deluxe edition, which sets the track's duration to 5:24. This version also appears on the digital release from Spotify.

Personnel
Credits are adapted from Ghost Stories liner notes.
Chris Martin – lead vocals, acoustic guitar, keyboards
Guy Berryman – bass guitar, keyboards
Jonny Buckland – electric guitar, slide guitar, keyboards
Will Champion – drum pad, percussion, reactable, backing vocals, electric guitar on "O"

Additional musicians
Timbaland – extra drums (track 4)
Apple Martin – additional vocals (track 9)
Moses Martin – additional vocals (track 9)
Mabel Krichefski – additional vocals (track 9)
John Metcalfe – strings arrangement, conductor
Davide Rossi – individual arrangement and strings (track 4)
Tim Bergling (Avicii) – piano (track 8)

Design
Mila Fürstová – artwork
Tappin Gofton – design, art direction
Phil Harvey – photography

Technical
Paul Epworth – production
Coldplay – production
Dan Green – production, mixing (track 7)
Rik Simpson – production, mixing (track 7)
Jon Hopkins – co-production (track 5), "extra magic" 
Tim Bergling – co-production (track 8)
Mark "Spike" Stent – mixing (track 1–6, 8, 9)
Geoff Swan – assistant mixing (track 1–6, 8, 9)
Mike Dean – "extra magic" (track 6)
Madeon – "extra magic" (track 1, 9)
Ted Jensen – mastering
Olga FitzRoy – engineering
Matt Wiggins – engineering
Jaime Sickora – engineering
Chris Owens – engineering
Joe Visciano – engineering
Tom Bailey – additional studio assistance
Fiona Cruickshank – additional studio assistance
Nicolas Essig – additional studio assistance
Jeff Gartenbaum – additional studio assistance
Christian Green – additional studio assistance
Joseph Hartwell Jones – additional studio assistance
Pablo Hernandez – additional studio assistance
Neil Lambert – additional studio assistance
Matt McGinn – additional studio assistance
Adam Miller – additional studio assistance
Roxy Pope – additional studio assistance
John Prestage – additional studio assistance
Bill Rahko – additional studio assistance
Kyle Stevens – additional studio assistance
Dave Holmes – management

Charts

Weekly charts

Year-end charts

Decade-end charts

All-time charts

Certifications

Release history

See also
 List of best-selling albums of 2014

Notes

References

External links

2014 albums
Albums produced by Jon Hopkins
Albums produced by Paul Epworth
Albums produced by Rik Simpson
Atlantic Records albums
Coldplay albums
Parlophone albums